Hausch is a surname of German origin. Notable people with the surname include:
 Agustin Hausch
Gudrun Hausch (born 1969), German judoka
Maylin Hausch, later known as Maylin Wende (born 1988), German pair skater

References

Surnames of German origin